Camille Georges Wermuth (died September 2015) was a chemist in the Laboratoire de Pharmacochimie Moleculaire at the Universite Louis Pasteur in Illkirch, France. He is particularly known for his editing of The Practice of Medicinal Chemistry (1996) which has been issued in four editions.

Selected publications
The Practice of Medicinal Chemistry. 1996.

References

20th-century French chemists
Year of birth missing
2015 deaths